Kelley Wirth is a former member of the house of representatives of the U.S. state of Oregon. She represented a District 35 (later renumbered as District 16 following the 2000 United States Census), which included the city of Corvallis.

Wirth, a Democrat, was one of two Oregon lawmakers to resign during the 73rd Oregon Legislative Assembly due to separate personal issues; the other was Dan Doyle (R–Salem). She was indicted for unlawful possession of methamphetamine, and resigned from the legislature effective November 15, 2005. Wayne Krieger (R-Gold Beach) introduced a bill during the following session to institute mandatory drug testing for Oregon lawmakers, but stated the bill had nothing to do with Wirth.

Wirth was born in Panorama City, California. She graduated from Corvallis High School (Oregon), earned a Bachelor of Science in political science at Oregon State University and a Master of Science in systems management at the University of Southern California. She chaired the Corvallis Planning Commission and served on several other local commissions prior to being elected to the Oregon Legislative Assembly. She worked as a systems analyst while serving as a legislator. While in the legislature, she served as the Democratic floor leader, and as a member of the government efficiency committee and the stream and restoration and species recovery committee.

Wirth, who was first elected to the House in 2000, went through a divorce in 2003. She has two daughters.

References 

Democratic Party members of the Oregon House of Representatives
Politicians from Corvallis, Oregon
Women state legislators in Oregon
Living people
21st-century American politicians
21st-century American women politicians
People from Panorama City, Los Angeles
Year of birth missing (living people)